The music of World War I is the music which was composed during the war or which is associated with it.

Music hall 

In 1914, music hall was by far the most popular form of popular song. It was listened to and sung along to in theatres which were getting ever larger (three thousand seaters were not uncommon) and in which the musical acts were gradually overshadowing all other acts (animal imitators, acrobats, human freaks, conjurors, etc.) The industry was more and more dominated by chains of theatres like Moss, and by music publishers, since selling sheet music was very profitable indeed—a real hit could sell over a million copies.

The seats at the music hall could be very cheap and attracted a largely working class audience, for whom a gramophone would generally be too expensive. Although many ordinary people had heard gramophones in seaside resorts or in park concerts organized by local councils, many more would discover the gramophone while in the army, since gramophone manufacturers produced large numbers of portable gramophones "for our soldiers in France".

The repertoire of songs was dominated by the jauntily comic. Humorous stereotypes of domineering wives or mothers-in-law, the bourgeoisie, foreigners, Blacks and Jews were often subjects of songs. Many more songs were made up of tongue-twisters or other comic elements. Sentimental love songs and dreams of an ideal land (Ireland or Dixie in particular) made up another major category. Practically all the songs of the era are unknown today; several thousand music hall songs were published in the UK alone during the war years.

The singers moved from town to town, many just scraping together a living, but a few making a lot of money. The key stars at the time included Marie Lloyd, Vesta Tilley, George Formby, Sr., Harry Lauder, Gertie Gitana and Harry Champion.

Enthusiasm for the war 

At the outbreak of war, many songs were produced which called for young men to join up. Examples included "Your King and Country Want You", "Now You've Got the Khaki On" or "Kitcheners' Boys". After a few months of war and rising numbers of deaths, the recruitment songs all but disappeared, and the 1915 "Greatest hits" collection published by Francis and Day contains no recruitment songs at all. The music hall songs which mentioned the war (about a third of the total produced) were more and more dreams about the end of the war—"When the Boys Come Home" and "Keep the Home Fires Burning" are two well-known examples.

Popular, patriotic songs that were composed during the war also served to raise the morale of soldiers and civilians alike. These hit songs covered a variety of themes, such as separation of loved ones, boot camp, war as an adventure, and humorous songs about the military life.

Because there were no radios or televisions that reported the conditions of the battlefields, Americans had a romantic view of war. Not only were many of the songs patriotic, but they were also romantic. These songs portrayed soldiers as brave and noble, while the women were portrayed as fragile and loyal as they waited for their loved ones.

Anti-war songs
It was almost impossible to sing anti-war songs on the music-hall stage. The managers of music halls would be worried about their license, and the singalong nature of music hall songs meant that one needed to sing songs which had the support of the vast majority of the audience. In the music hall, dissent about the war drive was therefore limited to sarcastic songs such as "Oh It's a Lovely War" or bitter complaints about the stupidity of conscription tribunals (for example "The Military Representative").
When the anti-war movement had, for a few months in 1916, a mass audience, anti-war music hall songs from the United States such as "I Didn't Raise My Boy to Be a Soldier" were sung at anti-war meetings, but not on the music hall stage.

See also
World War I in popular culture
:Category:Songs of World War I

References

Further reading
 Australia. Song Book 1918. Sydney: Sydney and Melbourne Pub, 1918. 
 Depasquale, Paul. The Courage Corporate: Adelaide Songs of World War One. Oakland Park, S. Aust: Pioneer Books in association with Academy Enterprises and Hermit Press, 1983.  
 Holden, Robert. And the Band Played On: How Music Lifted the Anzac Spirit in the Battlefields of the First World War. Richmond, Victoria: Hardie Grant Books, 2014.  
 Leo Feist, Inc. Songs the Soldiers and Sailors Sing!: A Collection of Favorite Songs As Sung by the Soldiers and Sailors - "Over Here" and "Over There," Including Complete Choruses (Words and Music) of 36 of the Most Popular and Most Sung "Newer" Songs. New York, N.Y.: Leo. Feist, 1918. 
 MacQuaile, Brendan. March Away My Brothers: Irish Soldiers and Their Music in the First World War. Dublin: Londubh Books, 2011.  
 Mullen, John. 'The Show Must Go On' : Popular Song in Britain during the First World War.  Farnham, Ashgate, 2015.
 National Society of the Colonial Dames of America. American War Songs. Portland, Me: Longwood Press, 1976.  
 Parker, Bernard S. World War I Sheet Music: 9,670 Patriotic Songs Published in the United States, 1914–1920, with More Than 600 Covers Illustrated. Jefferson, N.C. : McFarland, 2007.  
 
 Recorded Anthology of American Music, Inc. Praise the Lord and Pass the Ammunition Songs of World Wars I & II. Recorded Anthology of American Music, 1977. 
 United States. Songs of the Soldiers and Sailors, U.S. Washington: G.P.O., 1917.  
 Vogel, Frederick G. World War I Songs: A History and Dictionary of Popular American Patriotic Tunes, with Over 300 Complete Lyrics. Jefferson, N.C.: McFarland & Co, 1995.  
 Watkins, Glenn. Proof Through the Night: Music and the Great War. Berkeley: University of California Press, 2003.

External links 

"Propaganda and Dissent in British Popular Song during the Great War", an academic article by John Mullen.
Songs of war and peace: patriotic and popular.
Music Commemorations of World War I
Songs of the First World War.
Popular Songs of World War I.
Harmonies of the Homefront
Trench Songs.
World War I Sheet Music.
World War I
Songs of the Peace Movement of World War I
Over There
 Okada, Akeo: Music , in: 1914-1918-online. International Encyclopedia of the First World War.

World War I